Club Deportivo Chagüite are a Salvadoran professional football club based in Lolotiquillo, El Salvador.

Honours

Domestic honours
 Segunda División Salvadorean and predecessors 
 Champions (1) : TBD
 Tercera División Salvadorean and predecessors 
 Champions:(1) : Clausura 2017

Current squad
As of:

List of Coaches

References

Football clubs in El Salvador